Darenth Wood is a  biological Site of Special Scientific Interest east of Dartford in Kent.

This ancient semi-natural wood has many rare invertebrates, including thirty-two which are nationally scarce and two which are nationally rare: these are beetles which live in dead and dying oak timber, Grilis pannonicus and Platypus cylindricus.

The wood is crossed by roads and footpaths.

References

Sites of Special Scientific Interest in Kent
Forests and woodlands of Kent